Holly Kaleidoscope is an album by British musician Davy Graham, released in 1970. His wife at the time, Holly Gwyn, contributes on vocals.

Reception

In his Allmusic review, critic Ritchie Unterberger wrote, "Graham's final Decca LP was co-billed to his wife at the time, Holly Gwyn (credited simply as "Holly"), although she only appears on a few tracks... it's not one of Graham's more notable albums, but it's respectable, and the guitar work, of course, is nothing less than stellar."

Track listing
"Flower Never Bend With the Rainfall" (Paul Simon) – 2:48
"Wilt Thou Unkind" (Davy Graham) – 0:55
"Blackbird" (John Lennon, Paul McCartney) – 2:19
"Blues at Gino's" (Davy Graham) – 3:58
"Since I Fell for You" (Buddy Johnson) – 2:49
"Sunny Moon for Two" (Sonny Rollins) – 3:04
"Fingerbuster" (Davy Graham) – 1:33
"Here, There and Everywhere" (John Lennon, Paul McCartney) – 2:33
"Ramblin' Sailor" (Davy Graham) – 1:21
"Mary, Open the Door" (Duffy Power) – 2:01
"I Know My Love" (Traditional; arranged by Holly Gwin) – 2:48
"Charlie" (Davy Graham) – 2:43
"Bridge Over Troubled Water" (Paul Simon) – 3:08
"Little Man You've Had a Busy Day" (Maurice Sigler, Al Hoffman, Mabel Wayne) – 1:41

Personnel
Davy Graham – vocals, guitar
Holly Gwyn – vocals
Technical
Terry Johnson - engineer
David Wedgbury - photography

References 

1970 albums
Davey Graham albums
Decca Records albums